Ammar Gaiym Gatea also pronounced as Ammar Kayim, is an Iraqi forward. Gaiym currently plays for Al-Masafi in Iraq, and for the Iraq national football team.

Club career
He made his name playing for Al-Masafi and was signed by Duhok on September 16, 2010. However, after he was unable to keep his job in Baghdad and play for Duhok his contract was canceled by mutual consent on November 3.

National Team Debut
On November 11, 2010, Ammar made his debut coming on as a second-half substitute against India. Iraq won 2-0.

External links 
Profile on goalzz.com

Living people
Iraqi footballers
Year of birth missing (living people)
Sportspeople from Baghdad
Association football forwards
Iraq international footballers